Muhajir nationalism or Muhajirism is a vision that emphasizes that Muhajirs are one nation and promotes the cultural unity of Muhajirs around the Muhajir Province. The demands of the Muhajir nationalist movement are linguistic, cultural, economic and political rights. Amir H. Kazmi is considered as the Father of Muhajir nationalism. Muhajir nationalism, as put by Adeel Khan, was a political response to loss of their erstwhile influence in state machinery.

References

Muhajir nationalism